Keuka Park is a hamlet and census-designated place, population 1,137 in 2010 census, in Yates County, New York, United States. The hamlet is on the shore of the east branch of Keuka Lake in the Finger Lakes region.

Keuka College is located in Keuka Park next to the lake.

Demographics 

Keuka Park has the highest ratio of women to men in the state of New York, due to the university.  As of the 2010 census, there were 755 females (66.4%) to 382 males (33.6%).  The median age was 21.3 years.

References 

Hamlets in New York (state)
Census-designated places in Yates County, New York
Census-designated places in New York (state)
Hamlets in Yates County, New York